Ladislav Hlaváček (26 June 1925 – 21 April 2014; Prague) was a Czechoslovak football forward who played for Czechoslovakia in the 1954 FIFA World Cup. He also played for Dukla Prague.

References

External links
 
 FIFA profile

1925 births
2014 deaths
Czech footballers
Czechoslovak footballers
Czechoslovakia international footballers
Association football forwards
Dukla Prague footballers
1954 FIFA World Cup players
SK Slavia Prague players